Lubuczewo  (German Lübzow) is a village in the administrative district of Gmina Słupsk, within Słupsk County, Pomeranian Voivodeship, in northern Poland.

The village was the home of the von Braunschweig, one of whom Eberhard, though a member of the anti-Nazi resistance was murdered by Red Army troops in March 1945.

Before 1945 the area of Farther Pomerania, where the village is located,   was part of Germany.  After the end of World War II the region was granted to Poland and the German inhabitants were expelled.  

The village has a population of 466.

References

See also
History of Pomerania
Pomeranian Voivodeship

Lubuczewo